Eyman may refer to
Eyman (surname)
Arizona State Prison Complex – Eyman, a U.S. state prison
Jessie Eyman–Wilma Judson House in Honolulu, Hawaiʻi